Shasta may refer to one of seven peaks in the United States:

See also
Mount Shasta, California, a town in California at 
 Mount Shasta Wilderness, also in California at 

Shasta